"I Still Feel the Same About You" is a song written and recorded by American country singer-songwriter Bill Anderson. It was released as a single in 1975 via MCA Records and became a major hit the same year.

Background and release
"I Still Feel the Same About You" was recorded on September 27, 1974, at the RCA Studio, located in Nashville, Tennessee. It was Anderson's seventh formal session at the RCA Studio after spending many years recording at his producer's studio. The sessions were produced by Owen Bradley, who would serve as Anderson's producer through most of years with MCA Records. Two additional tracks were cut at the same studio session.

"Every Time I Turn the Radio On" was released as a single by MCA Records in January 1975. The song spent 11 weeks on the Billboard Hot Country Singles before reaching number 14 in April 1975. In Canada, the single reached number 16 on the RPM Country Songs chart in 1975. It was released on his 1975 studio album, Every Time I Turn the Radio On/Talk to Me Ohio.

Track listings
7" vinyl single
 "I Still Feel the Same About You" – 2:54
 "Talk to Me Ohio" – 2:51

Chart performance

References

1975 singles
1975 songs
Bill Anderson (singer) songs
MCA Records singles
Song recordings produced by Owen Bradley
Songs written by Bill Anderson (singer)